The 1983 Race of Champions was a non-championship Formula One race held at Brands Hatch on 10 April 1983. Contested over 40 laps, it was the final non-championship F1 race to be held in the sport's history (with exception of the Formula One Indoor Trophy sprint event held between 1988 to 1996). Reigning World Champion Keke Rosberg won in a Williams-Ford, narrowly beating the Tyrrell-Ford of F1 rookie Danny Sullivan, while  World Champion Alan Jones was third in an Arrows-Ford.

Report

Entry
The teams who did not attend, or only sent one of their two cars, were at a scheduled Formula One tyre test at the Paul Ricard Circuit in the south of France in preparation for the French Grand Prix which was held at the same circuit just one week later.

There were two drivers present who did not take part in that year's championship: Brian Henton, who drove a Theodore, and Héctor Rebaque, who drove a Brabham. The Spirit team also made its F1 debut at the event with Swedish driver Stefan Johansson and Honda's first turbo-charged F1 engine, which BBC commentator Murray Walker claimed had completed thousands of miles of trouble free testing. Tyrrell fronted with only one driver. Michele Alboreto was scheduled to race, but it clashed with his drive for Lancia in the opening round of the World Endurance Championship at Monza. Instead his rookie teammate, 32-year-old American Danny Sullivan, was given the opportunity to get more miles under race conditions having only completed in the previous two Grands Prix in Brazil and  Long Beach. McLaren fronted with a car for John Watson, fresh from his victory in Long Beach just two weeks earlier. Arrows fronted with two cars, one for 1980 World Champion Alan Jones in his second (and final) drive for the team after making a comeback to F1 at Long Beach, and team driver Chico Serra.

Eleven teams took part, but only Arrows and Theodore entered more than one car. Brabham elected not to use either of its regular drivers Nelson Piquet or Riccardo Patrese, hence Rebaque's presence (he had previously driven for the team in ). Like Alboreto, Patrese was driving for Lancia at Monza, while Piquet was advertised to be driving but was actually at the scheduled tyre test at Paul Ricard, so Brabham fronted with Rebaque instead. This drew criticism from Murray Walker's co-commentator,  World Champion James Hunt, who questioned why Brabham couldn't have put an up-and-coming British driver in the car for what really was a British domestic race. Williams fronted with one car for the reigning World Champion Keke Rosberg. The Williams race team was actually at Paul Ricard and Rosberg's car (the team's test car) was tended to by the team's test crew who were given the job by team boss Frank Williams as a reward for their hard work in developing the now flat bottomed Williams FW08C. Lotus used the event as an opportunity to familiarise Nigel Mansell with the Lotus 93T and its turbocharged Renault engine it had so far limited to the team's lead driver Elio de Angelis. Of the thirteen cars, four were turbos including the Ferrari of René Arnoux, although with the Lotus-Renault still new, Brabham without a regular driver and the Spirit-Honda on debut, only Arnoux was rated a chance of victory among the turbos.

Qualifying
Keke Rosberg took pole position in his Cosworth powered Williams, replicating the result at the previous year's British Grand Prix, also held at Brands Hatch, though without the ground effect his pole time of 1:15.766 was significantly slower than his 1982 pole time of 1:09.540. René Arnoux was less than one tenth of a second behind in his Ferrari turbo, and Alan Jones took an encouraging third place in his continuing comeback from retirement with Arrows. Behind John Watson's McLaren-Ford, Sullivan qualified in fifth place despite suffering from jet lag, as he had only arrived in the United Kingdom from the United States the day before the track action began. The two Theodore drivers proved evenly matched in sixth and seventh, with Henton outpacing regular driver Roberto Guerrero. Mansell qualified eighth with his first taste of a turbo engine in competitive conditions; he was followed by Raul Boesel in the Ligier, Rebaque's Brabham and Chico Serra in the other Arrows. Johansson set the second-fastest time in un-timed practice with a time that would have actually placed him 3rd on the grid, but suffered reliability problems in qualifying proper, restricting him to a single lap and 12th place on the grid in a difficult début for the Spirit team, but he still lined up ahead of Jean-Louis Schlesser, who failed to record a lap time for RAM March. The Spirit Honda again proved its speed in the race morning warm-up where Johansson reportedly was among the quickest on the circuit with times within one second of Arnoux's turbocharged Ferrari.

Race
Rosberg and Arnoux held their grid positions off the line, but Sullivan rose to third place after being given a nudge under braking for the first corner, the extra momentum forcing him into overtaking Jones around the outside instead of hitting him. Arnoux used the estimated  available from his Ferrari 126C2B to blast past Rosberg on the straight at Pilgrims Drop on the first lap, but tyre trouble prevented him from pulling away. Johansson was the first retirement after four laps, the new Honda engine failing on its F1 début. Johansson had made a good start and had passed four cars before the Honda engine started to smoke going into Dingle Dell on lap 4 while chasing Rebaque. After a quiet first start with turbo power, Nigel Mansell ended his race with handling difficulties two laps later.

On lap seven, Arnoux, who had been passed for the lead by Rosberg going into Surtees, pitted for new tyres, his Ferrari wearing its rubber extremely quickly despite cool ambient temperatures (Arnoux also had major tyre troubles in practice and was lucky not to damage the car after blowing a rear tyre at speed on the run to Clearways). By lap 23 and two further stops, his team had no further sets of tyres and he was forced to retire with camshaft trouble, although he had set the fastest lap of the race as consolation, though his lap of 1:17.826 in the flat bottomed Ferrari was 5.458 seconds shy of Didier Pironi's lap record of 1:12.368 set at the 1980 British Grand Prix in a ground effects Ligier-Ford. Watson retired with a bad driveline vibration, while Rebaque retired with tyre and suspension failure in a car he wasn't totally comfortable with. In commentary, Murray Walker claimed that Rebaque looked at sea in the powerful Brabham-BMW, despite his recent experience in racing cars at the ultra-fast Indianapolis Motor Speedway and other oval speedways in the American-based CART series. Serra's car broke its gear linkage also retired from the race.

At around half-distance of the forty-lap race, Rosberg also began to suffer from tyre wear, particularly blistering to his left-rear. Sullivan was using a softer-compound set of tyres, but had "scrubbed" them in the pre-race warm-up and had no such problems. For the final fifteen laps, he was right behind Rosberg, but never managed to overtake the Williams. Despite running side by side at places on the last lap, Rosberg held on to win from Sullivan, with Jones (still with two pins in his hip after breaking it falling off a horse on his farm in Australia) half a minute behind in third. Henton, Boesel, and the lapped Schlesser and Guerrero completed the finishers.

Rosberg would later add the championship Monaco Grand Prix to his victory haul in 1983, but the other finishers would not approach their results at this race in any other F1 Grand Prix in 1983. As the World Championship had become ever-more important in the increasingly commercial world of Formula One, the 1983 Race of Champions remains the final non-championship race to have been held in the sport's history, with exception of the Formula One Indoor Trophy sprint event held between 1988 to 1996.

Classification

Entry list

Qualifying

Race

 Fastest lap: René Arnoux, 1:17.826 (lap 18)
 Lap leaders: René Arnoux (1–6), Keke Rosberg (7–40)

References

Race of Champions (Brands Hatch)
Race of Champions
Race of Champions
Race of Champions